Bernadette Essossimna Legzim-Balouki (born January 20, 1959 in Lomé) is a Togolese politician.

Legzim-Balouki was Minister of Primary, Secondary and Literacy Education in Gilbert Fossoun Houngbo's second government.

Later, Legzim-Balouki was Minister of Trade and Private Sector Promotion in Arthème Kwesi Séléagodji Ahoomey-Zunu's government.

References

Living people
21st-century Togolese women politicians
21st-century Togolese politicians
1959 births
People from Lomé
Trade ministers of Togo
Education ministers of Togo
Women government ministers of Togo